The Summit Media Group Inc. was an American New York City based subsidiary of 4Kids Entertainment, and formerly of Leisure Concepts. This subsidiary served print and broadcast media–planning and buying services for clients in the children's toy and game business. Summit was also a television syndication company which distributed a number of children's TV shows for syndication.

History 
Along with 4Kids Productions, the Summit Media Group was established by Leisure Concepts in 1992, and later became a subsidiary of the later renamed 4Kids Entertainment in 1995.

On June 24, 2006, 4Kids Entertainment announced that it would be closing the Summit Media Group after 14 years of existence.

Executive management

Chief Executive Officers 
 Sheldon Hirsch (November 1992 – February 16, 2006)
 Lee Ravdin (February 16, 2006 – June 24, 2006)

Shows produced and distributed by The Summit Media Group  
Since its founding in 1992 Summit distributed the following TV shows for syndication:

 Pick Your Brain (1993–1994)
 Mega Man (1994–1995) 
 Oscar's Orchestra (1994–1996) 
 WMAC Masters (1995–1997) 
 Enchanted Tales (1995–1998) 
 Darkstalkers (1995)
 Mark's Wired World (1997–1998) 
 The Mr. Men Show (1997–1999) 
 Van Pires (1997–1998) 
 The New Adventures of Voltron (1997–1998) 
 Pokémon (1998–1999) (Season 1) 
 War Planets (1998–1999)  
 RoboCop: Alpha Commando (1998–1999)  
 Cubix (2001–2002) (season 1 only) 
 Yu-Gi-Oh! (2001–2002) (season 1 only) 
 Tama and Friends (2001–2002)

The company also syndicated three specials
 Mr. Magoo's Christmas Carol 
 Cinderella on Ice
 Cabbage Patch Kids Presents “Vernon's Christmas

Clients of Summit Media 
 Nintendo
 Capcom
 RoseArt
 Topps
 ThinkWay Toys
 XConcepts
 Jakks Pacific
 Big Toys Time
 THQ
 Toy Island
 Spin Master Toys
 Manley Toy Quest
 Trendmasters
 Flying Colors
 3DO
 Pokémon Center
 Taiyo Edge R/C
 Sega

References 

Mass media companies established in 1992
1992 establishments in New York City
Mass media companies disestablished in 2006
2006 disestablishments in New York (state)
4Kids Entertainment
Defunct companies based in New York City